Gyunyeo or Kyun Yeo (923–973) was a Korean Buddhist monk and poet. He came from the Hwangju Byeon clan. Among his works are "Songs of the Ten Vows Samantabhara." These songs are set out in 1075 in the biography The Life of Kuehne. This is the first extant collection of poetry in Korean. He played an important role in the spread of the Hwaeom school of Buddhism.

In popular culture
Portrayed by Jung Seung-ho in the 2002–2003 KBS1 TV series The Dawn of the Empire.

References

Further references
 Kyunyo-Jon: The Life, Times and Songs of a Tenth Century Korean Monk (University of Sydney East Asian Series)
 Lee, Peter H., 1961, "The Importance of the Kyunyŏ Chŏn (1075) in Korean Buddhism and Literature-Bhadra-Cari-Pranidhạna in Tenth Century Korea," Journal of the American Oriental Society 81 (4):409–414,

External links
Gyunyeo on Encykorea .

917 births
973 deaths
Korean male poets
Buddhist poets
Goryeo Buddhist monks
10th-century Korean poets
Hwangju Byeon clan